This is a list of Austrian states by Human Development Index as of 2021.

Development 1995–2015 
Human Development Index of Austrian states since 1995.

See also
List of countries by Human Development Index

References 

Ranked lists of country subdivisions
Human Development Index
Economy of Austria-related lists